UniFi Mobile is a Malaysian converged telecommunications, broadband, and 4G service provider. Originally known as Packet One Networks (P1), the company was founded on 11 February 2002 and is a subsidiary of Green Packet Berhad.

Overview
UniFi Mobile operates 4G WiMAX, 4G LTE and 4G LTE-A networks, and sharing spectrum from Celcom with 2G EDGE networks.

In March 2007, P1 was one of four companies awarded 2.3 GHz spectrum licenses by the Malaysian government to deploy 4G WiMAX services throughout Malaysia. In August 2008, P1 became the first company to launch commercial WiMAX services in Malaysia.

In March 2014, Telekom Malaysia (TM) Berhad bought a 57% stake in P1 for RM 350 million. TM is to invest RM 1 billion in P1 over the next four years.

In April 2016, the company was officially re-branded as Web Digital Sdn. Bhd. May 2017 saw the announcement of the company's latest CEO, Moharmustaqeem Mohammed, replacing Azizi A. Hady.

In January 2018, TM relaunched its mobile service as one UniFi Mobile brand. UniFi Mobile is a prepaid plan operating on an annual contract. The UniFi mobile LTE network consists of 850 MHz FDD-LTE (Band 5), 2300 MHz TD-LTE (Band 40) and TD-LTE 2600 MHz (Band 38). UniFi mobile utilizes its MgO 850 MHz LTE band 5 spectrum (reformed from CDMA 850 MHz), and Celcom provides domestic roaming on 3G and 2G. On the 2.3 GHz WiMAX and 2.6 GHz LTE bands.

 Uses Celcom 2.6 GHz (Band 7) for some in-building coverage.
 Uses Celcom 2G network

Milestones
 Alcatel-Lucent – January 2008
 Intel Corporation – May 2008
 Oracle Corporation – May 2008
 EMC Corporation – June 2008
 Fiber ail – June 2008
 ZTE China  – March 2009
 SK Telecom announced strategic alliance with P1, which SK Telecom will acquire approximately 25% stake in P1 – June 2010
 Qualcomm – June 2011
 China Mobile – June 2011
 Telekom Malaysia – Oct 2011

Packet One was discontinued as a company after Telekom Malaysia's purchase.

Its W1MAX product offering still exists, though it now focuses on LTE as web.

Awards and Accolade
 Red Herring Asia - Winner Most Innovative Private Technology Company 2008
 PC.COM - Top 10 Tech Brands for 2009
 PC.COM - Best WiMAX Service 2009
 MSC Malaysia APICTA - Winner Best of Start-Up Companies 2009
 FROST & SULLIVAN TELECOMS AWARDS 2010 - Most Promising Service Provider of the Year
 The Effectiveness Awards (EFFIE) 2010  - Gold winner for “Sudha Patong?” or “Cut Already?” Campaign
 The Global Leadership Award 2011 - Winner of Internet Category
 Golden Global Brand Award 2011 - The Best Enterprise Brand of the Year 2010

References

External links
 

Telecommunications companies of Malaysia
Mobile phone companies of Malaysia
Internet service providers of Malaysia
Telecommunications companies established in 2002
Malaysian companies established in 2002
Privately held companies of Malaysia